Diceratothrips is a genus of thrips in the family Phlaeothripidae.

Species
 Diceratothrips bennetti
 Diceratothrips bicornis
 Diceratothrips cornutus
 Diceratothrips cubensis
 Diceratothrips delicatus
 Diceratothrips garciaamaroae
 Diceratothrips harti
 Diceratothrips horridus
 Diceratothrips inferorum
 Diceratothrips longipes
 Diceratothrips nigricauda
 Diceratothrips obscuricornis
 Diceratothrips pallidior
 Diceratothrips picticornis
 Diceratothrips robustus
 Diceratothrips sakimurai
 Diceratothrips setigenis
 Diceratothrips validipennis

References

Phlaeothripidae
Thrips
Thrips genera